Colonel Aleksandr Nikolayevich Poteyev (Александр Николаевич Потеев) is the former Deputy Head of Directorate "S" of the Russian Foreign Intelligence Service (SVR) from 2000–2010.

Beginning around 1999, he began working secretly with the CIA, helping to reveal a hidden network of Russian spies operating within the United States, known as the Illegals Program.

In late June 2010, a successful operation to extract Poteyev from Russia was executed with the assistance of the CIA.

He is reported to be living in the United States under an assumed identity.

Early life
Poteyev was born in the Brest Region of the Republic of Belarus. His father, Nikolai Pavlovich Poteyev, had been declared a Hero of the USSR in 1944 for having destroyed nine enemy tanks.

Career

1970s
Poteyev enlisted in the army during the 1970s. Afterward, he entered the service of the KGB, working primarily in Minsk. Soon thereafter, he travelled to Afghanistan as part of several elite Special Forces units, including "Zenith", "Cascade-1", and "Cascade-2".

For his services in Afghanistan, he was awarded the Order of the Red Banner. After returning from Afghanistan, Poteyev graduated from the Academy of Foreign Intelligence, and then went on to work for the First Chief Directorate of the USSR.

1990s
Working under official cover as a representative from the Russian Ministry of Foreign Affairs, Poteyev took around a dozen short trips to several western countries during the 1990s, including Mexico, Chile, and New York City in the United States.

According to a Russian court, Poteyev began passing information about Russian sleeper agents under his command to the CIA since around 1999.

2000s
In 2000, Poteyev was appointed to Deputy Head of Directorate "S" of the SVR, where he was tasked with overseeing a network of spies living inside the United States.

Sometime around 2001, Poteyev is reported to have "cashed in" on a contract with the CIA that is said to have brought him somewhere between $2 and $5 million.

On January 25, 2003, Poteyev's wife, Marina, filed a police report claiming that three individuals disguised as law enforcement had broken into the Poteyevs' apartment in Moscow. Once inside, the individuals reportedly robbed and attacked members of the Poteyev family.

2010s
In the first half of 2010, the SVR (Russian Foreign Intelligence Service) had begun to suspect that a high-ranking mole was operating within their system. Aware that plans were being made to submit lie detector tests to personnel within the SVR, Poteyev directed his son to travel to the United States in June 2010, where Poteyev's wife and daughter were already living.

In May 2010, Poteyev reportedly asked permission from his superiors to travel to Odessa to visit a purported mistress of his, but the request was denied.

On June 24, 2010, without having informed his superiors beforehand, Poteyev purchased a rail ticket from Moscow to Minsk. From there, he made his way to Ivano-Frankivsk, then on to Frankfurt, before finally arriving at CIA headquarters in the United States on June 26, 2010. The following day, on June 27, 2010, the FBI began arresting the Russian spies who had been operating within the United States under Poteyev's direction.

On June 27, 2011, a Russian court found Poteyev guilty of high treason, and had him sentenced in absentia to 25 years in prison.

Life in America
On November 11, 2010, Kommersant reported that Colonel Alexandr Shcherbakov of the SVR was the person who had revealed the identities of the Russian spies to U.S. authorities. However, five days later, Kommersant issued a correction to the story, noting that it was not Shcherbakov, but Poteyev.

Around late 2013 or early 2014, a suspected Russian hit man on a valid U.S. visa had reportedly approached Poteyev's home in Florida, as well as the city of one of Poteyev's relatives.

On July 7, 2016, Russian news agencies reported unconfirmed rumors that Poteyev had died in the United States. In October 2018, BuzzFeed News reported that he was alive and living openly in Florida under his own identity.

References

1952 births
Living people
People from Brest, Belarus
People convicted of treason against Russia